The Peel Memorial is a public statue by Edward Hodges Baily, a nineteenth-century British artist best known for his sculpture of Nelson on Nelson's Column. It is located in the centre of Bury, Greater Manchester. The statue commemorates the life of Sir Robert Peel, twice UK Prime Minister and founder of the British Conservative Party, who was born in Bury.

The statue is of bronze, and stands 3.5m high. Peel is depicted in contemporary dress, "addressing the House of Commons on the memorable subject of Free Trade"

The statue is mounted on a granite pedestal 3.66m high. The front of the pedestal bears the Peel family coat of arms and the word "Peel" in bronze capital letters. On the left and right sides are bronze bas-reliefs representing Commerce and Navigation. On the back of the pedestal is a circular bronze panel containing a quotation from one of Peel's speeches.

The statue was originally surrounded by an iron railing with gas lights at each corner, although this was later removed.

Inscription 

The inscription on the back of the pedestal contains the words "IT MAY BE, / I SHALL LEAVE A NAME / SOMETIMES REMEMBERED / WITH EXPRESSIONS OF GOOD WILL / IN THE ABODE OF THOSE WHOSE LOT / IT IS TO LABOR, AND TO EARN THEIR / DAILY BREAD BY THE SWEAT OF / THEIR BROW - WHEN THEY SHALL / RECRUIT THEIR EXHAUSTED STRENGTH / WITH ABUNDANT AND UNTAXED FOOD / THE SWEETER, BECAUSE IT IS / NO LONGER LEAVENED BY A / SENSE OF INJUSTICE" This is a quotation from Peel's speech to the House of Commons upon resigning as Prime Minister on 29 June 1846.

History 

On Wednesday 10 July 1850, eight days after Peel's sudden and unexpected death, a public meeting in the court house at Bury Town Hall resolved that "a monument be erected in some central part of the town as a perpetual memorial of our eminent townsman."

A Testimonial Committee was appointed to erect the memorial, and subscriptions were invited to raise funds for it. Eventually a sum of £2,700 was collected, of which £2,500 was to be spent on the memorial, with the remainder covering expenses. Nearly 2,000 individuals contributed, with subscriptions varying from £200 given by Mr Thomas Norris of Preston, to 1d donated by Miss Rachel Knowles.

The committee decided that the memorial should take the form of a bronze statue on a granite base. Rather than hold an open competition, it was decided to invite submissions from notable sculptors. Twenty one artists were asked to submit ideas, including Baily, Carlo Marochetti, John Henry Foley and William Calder Marshall.

In February 1851 an exhibition was held at the town hall to allow the public to inspect the submissions. Many statuettes, busts and architectural designs were displayed. 14,286 people viewed the exhibits over a period of several days. The venue forbade admission to "Persons in Clogs", however so enthusiastic were the working people of Bury to see the exhibition that many "ran up the steps in their stocking-feet". Following a committee meeting on 14 February 1851, it was decided to offer the commission to Baily.

The statue was cast at Frederic Robinson and Edward Cottam's Statue Foundry and Bronze Works in Pimlico, London. The foundry employed a new technique which allowed the statue to be cast as a single piece of bronze,. It was described as "a cast of surpassing beauty - almost perfect from the mould itself".

The finished statue was inaugurated on Wednesday 8 September 1852. The ceremony was attended by Peel's brothers John (the Dean of Worcester) and Lawrence, his son Frederick (at that time MP for Bury), many local dignitaries, and a crowd of 10–15,000 local people.

The statue was designated a Grade II listed building on 29 January 1985.

Baily's maquette for the sculpture is preserved at Bury Art Museum.

The buttons on the sculpted garments are accidentally reversed and are on "the girl's side."

For a while there were public toilets below the memorial and his hand gestured to the men's entrance.

References 

1851 sculptures
Grade II listed buildings in the Metropolitan Borough of Bury
Monuments and memorials in Greater Manchester
Robert Peel